Hamza Banouh (born May 7, 1990) is an Algerian footballer who plays for NC Magra in the Algerian Ligue Professionnelle 1.

References

External links
 

Living people
1990 births
Algerian footballers
MO Béjaïa players
Olympique de Médéa players
USM El Harrach players
ES Sétif players
JS Kabylie players
Association football forwards
21st-century Algerian people